Brawn is a surname. Notable people with the surname include:

 Billy Brawn (1878–1932), English footballer
 Anna Livia Julian Brawn (1955–2007), American writer
 Ross Brawn (born 1954), British Formula One managing director

See also
 Braun
 Brawner
 Brown (surname)